John Nicholas Udall usually called Nick Udall (July 23, 1913 – June 15, 2005) was mayor of Phoenix, Arizona from 1948–52. He was a member of the Udall political family and was also a nephew of Spencer W. Kimball, the 12th President of the Church of Jesus Christ of Latter-day Saints.

Biography  

Udall was born and raised in Arizona.  His parents John Hunt Udall and Ruth Kimball were in the same English literature class at the St. Joseph Stake Academy (now Eastern Arizona College), and when learning about playwright Nicholas Udall, they joked that if they ever got married, that they would name their son Nick, which they did.

Udall attended Brigham Young University and the University of Arizona before enrolling in The George Washington University Law School, graduating in 1943.  After graduation, he returned home to Arizona, where he began his law practice.

He followed in his father's footsteps, and served as mayor of Phoenix from 1948 to 1952.  He served with then-City Councilman Barry Goldwater.  From 1952 to 1956 he served as judge of the Maricopa County Superior Court.  Nick left the bench to return to private legal practice at Jennings, Strouss, Salmon & Trask in Phoenix, where he practiced law until retiring in 1992.
 
A lifelong member of the Church of Jesus Christ of Latter-day Saints, Nick served in various church positions, including service as a full-time missionary in the Eastern Central States mission from 1934 to 1936, as Bishop of the Phoenix Third Ward from 1970 to 1975 ("the most satisfying calling that a worthy priesthood holder can have" because "he is continually helping people"), and as Patriarch of the Phoenix Arizona Stake from 1975 to 1991.

Nick and his wife, Sybil Elizabeth Webb, are the parents of seven children. They are buried alongside each other in Greenwood/Memory Lawn Mortuary & Cemetery in Phoenix, Arizona. Following Sybil's death in 1998, Nick married Joan Romney in 2001.

His autobiography, "The Wonder of It All," was published by FCP Publishing in 2006.

See also

Udall family

External links
Nick Udall's obituary
Biography at the Political Graveyard

20th-century American biographers
Mayors of Phoenix, Arizona
Udall family
Brigham Young University alumni
University of Arizona alumni
George Washington University Law School alumni
Patriarchs (LDS Church)
American Mormon missionaries in the United States
American leaders of the Church of Jesus Christ of Latter-day Saints
20th-century Mormon missionaries
1913 births
2005 deaths
Arizona Republicans
Latter Day Saints from Arizona